Brahmanpalli is a village in Peddapalli mandal of Peddapalli district in the state of Telangana in India Brahmanapalli has a population of 1,909 within its village limits, according to 2011 census. It is located about 6 km (3.7 mi) from Peddapalli.

Villages in Peddapalli district
Peddapalli district